Maransin may refer to :
 Maransin, a French town of the département of Gironde,
 Jean-Pierre Maransin (1770–1828), French general.